Year 1497 (MCDXCVII) was a common year starting on Sunday (link will display the full calendar) of the Julian calendar.

Events 
 January–December 
 February 7 (Shrove Tuesday) – Followers of Girolamo Savonarola burn thousands of "immoral" objects, at the Bonfire of the Vanities in Florence.
 May – The Cornish Rebellion breaks out in England, incited by war taxes.
 May 10 – Amerigo Vespucci allegedly leaves Cádiz, for his first voyage to the New World. 
 May 12 – Pope Alexander VI excommunicates Girolamo Savonarola. 
 May 20 – John Cabot sets sail from Bristol, on the ship Matthew (principally owned by Richard Amerike), looking for new lands to the west (some sources give a May 2 date).
 June 13 – The Catholic Monarchs issue the ordinance of Medina del Campo, creating a money system based on the copper maravedí, creating the peso of 34 maravedis. In the next three centuries, this system will dominate international payments. It will be used in almost all parts of the Americas and large parts of Asia. It is the basis for a number of modern currencies, including the U.S. dollar.
 June 17 – Battle of Deptford Bridge near London: Cornish rebels under Michael An Gof are soundly defeated by Henry VII.  
 June 24 – John Cabot lands in North America (near present day Bonavista, Newfoundland).
 July 8 – Vasco da Gama's fleet departs from Lisbon, beginning his expedition to India.
 September 7 – Second Cornish Uprising in England: Perkin Warbeck lands near Land's End; on September 10 he is proclaimed as King in Bodmin.
 September 28 –Battle of Rotebro: John, King of Denmark, defeats Sten Sture the Elder.
 September 30 – The Treaty of Ayton establishes a seven-year peace between England and Scotland.
 October 4 – Leaders of the Second Cornish Uprising surrender to the King at Taunton; the following day, Warbeck, having deserted his army, is captured at Beaulieu Abbey in Hampshire.
 October 6 – Sten Sture the Elder is forced to resign and end his 27-year term as Regent of Sweden. King John of Denmark and Norway is acknowledged by the estates as King of Sweden and formally elected on October 18, restoring the power of the Kalmar Union.
 December 5 – King Manuel I of Portugal proclaims an edict in which he demands that Jews convert to Christianity or leave the country.
 December 23 – Sheen Palace is destroyed by fire. Henry VII of England rebuilds it as Richmond Palace.

 Date unknown 
 Babur takes Samarkand at the age of fifteen after a seven-month siege. He will hold the city for 100 days.
 Ivan the Great issues his law code, the Sudebnik.
 The Ottomans give Russian merchants freedom of trade within the empire.
 Iamblichus De mysteriis Aegyptorum edited by Marsilio Ficino is published.
 The Annals of the Four Masters refer to a famine in Ireland which "prevailed through all Ireland".

Births 
 February 16 – Philip Melanchthon, German humanist and reformer (d. 1560)
 February 19 – Matthäus Schwarz, German fashion writer (d. 1574)
 March – Giovanni Paolo I Sforza, Italian condottiero (d. 1535)
 April 2 – Georg Giese, German merchant (d. 1562)
 April 16 – Mōri Motonari, Japanese daimyō (d. 1571)
 April 17 – Pedro de Valdivia, Spanish conquistador (d. 1553)
 May 3 – Wilhelm IV of Eberstein, President of the Reichskammergericht (d. 1562)
 May 21 – Al-Hattab, Tripolitanian Muslim jurist (d. 1547)
 June 27 – Ernest I, Duke of Brunswick-Lüneburg (d. 1546)
 July 15 – Francis of Denmark, Danish prince (d. 1511)
 August 18 – Francesco Canova da Milano, Italian composer (d. 1543)
 September 10 – Wolfgang Musculus, German theologian (d. 1563)
 October 29 – Benedetto Accolti the Younger, Italian cardinal (d. 1549)
 date unknown
 Jean Fernel, French physician (d. 1558)
 Anne Seymour, Duchess of Somerset, English noblewoman (d. 1587)
 Gonzalo de Sandoval, Spanish conquistador (d. 1528)
 Margareta Eriksdotter Vasa, Swedish noblewoman (d. 1536)
 Johann Wild, German preacher (d. 1554)
 probable
 Francesco Berni, Italian poet (d. 1536)
 John Heywood, English playwright (d. 1580)

Deaths 
 January 3 – Beatrice d'Este, Duchess of Milan (b. 1475)
 January 30 – Lê Thánh Tông, Emperor of Vietnam (b. 1442)
 February 6 – Johannes Ockeghem, Flemish composer (b. c. 1410)
 May 26 – Antonio Manetti, Italian mathematician and architect (b. 1423)
 June 14 – Giovanni Borgia, 2nd Duke of Gandía (assassinated) (b.1474)
 June 27
 Michael An Gof, Cornish rebel leader (executed)
 Thomas Flamank, Cornish rebel leader (executed)
 June 28 – James Tuchet, 7th Baron Audley (b. c. 1463)
 July – Estêvão da Gama, Portuguese explorer ( b. c. 1430)
 July 23 – Barbara Fugger, German banker (b. 1419) 
 August 24 – Sophie of Pomerania, Duchess of Pomerania (b. 1435) 
 October 4 – John, Prince of Asturias, only son of Ferdinand II of Aragon and Isabella I of Castile (b. 1478)
 November 7 – Philip II, Duke of Savoy (b. 1443)
 November 30 – Anna Sforza, Italian noble (b. 1476)
 date unknown
 Al-Mutawakkil II, Caliph of Cairo
 Al-Sakhawi, Egyptian scholar (b. 1428)
 Albert Brudzewski, Polish astronomer (b. 1445)
 Gentile de' Becchi, Bishop of Arezzo (b. 1420/1430)
 probable – Elia del Medigo, Italian philosopher (b. 1460)

References